The 2017-18 Botswana First Division North was the 53rd season of the Botswana First Division North football league since its inception in 1966. It was played from August to May. BR Highlanders were crowned champions.

Team summaries

League table

References

Football in Botswana